There have been several people named Schnitzler:

 Arthur Schnitzler (born 1862), an Austrian playwright and author, son of Johann
 Barbara Schnitzler (born 1953, Berlin), a German actress (de)
 Claude Schnitzler (born 1949, Strasbourg), an Alsatian-French organist (fr)
 Conrad Schnitzler (born 1937, Düsseldorf), a German experimental musician
 Dierk H. Schnitzler, a German senior police officer in Bonn (1993–2002)
 Friedrich Wilhelm Schnitzler (born 1928, Ohnastetten), a German business manager and CDU politician
 Johann Schnitzler (born 1835), a Jewish Hungarian-Austrian laryngologist, father of Arthur
Liliane Schnitzler, French dermatologist who first described Schnitzler syndrome
 Michoel Schnitzler, a chassidic singer
 René Schnitzler (born 1985, Mönchengladbach), a German football player

Von Schnitzler 
Schnitzler is also a Prussian aristocrat:
 Karl Eduard Schnitzler (1792, Gräfrath – 1864, Köln) (de)
 Eduard Schnitzler (1823, Köln – 1900), a German merchant ∞ Emilie Maria Rath (de)
 Richard von Schnitzler (1855, Köln – 1938), a German banker, nonexecutive board member of IG Farben ∞ Melanie Stein (b. 1858), a daughter of Karl (Carl Martin) Stein (de)
 Georg (August Eduard) von (since September 20, 1913) Schnitzler (1884, Köln – 1962, Basel), executive board member of IG Farben ∞ Lilly von Schnitzler (de)
 Ottilie Marie Edith von Schröder ∞ Kurt Freiherr von Schröder
 Julius Eduard von (since September 20, 1913) Schnitzler (b. 1863) ∞ Margarethe Gillet
 Karl-Eduard von Schnitzler (1918–2001), East German television personality and propagandist

See also 
 Schnitzler syndrome
 Schnitz
 Schnitzer
 Schnitzel

German-language surnames
Jewish surnames
Occupational surnames